State Highway 1 (SH 1) is a state highway in Jharkhand, India.

Route
SH 1 originates from its junction with State Highway 4A (West Bengal) at Jhalda / Muri and passes through Silli, Tati, Namkum and terminates at its junction with National Highway 20 at Ranchi.

The total length of SH 1 is 65 km.

References

State Highways in Jharkhand